Hypericum decaisneanum is a species of flowering plant of the St. John's wort family (Hypericaceae) that is found in the Libya.

Taxonomy 
The placement of H. decaisneanum within Hypericum can be summarized as follows:

Hypericum
 Hypericum subg. Hypericum
 Hypericum sect. Adenosepalum
 subsect. Adenosepalum
 subsect. Aethiopica
 subsect. Caprifolia
 Huber-Morathii group
H. decaisneanum
H. formosissimum
H. huber-morathii
H. minutum
H. sechmenii

References 

decaisneanum
Flora of Libya
Plants described in 1889